The military of the United States is deployed in most countries around the world, with between 160,000 to 170,000 of its active-duty personnel stationed outside the United States and its territories. This list consists of deployments excepting active combat deployments, including troops in Syria and Yemen.

Outside of active combat, US personnel are typically deployed as part of several peacekeeping missions, military attachés, or are part of embassy and consulate security. Nearly 40,000 are assigned to classified missions in locations that the US government refuses to disclose.

Rationale

Statements by U.S. military and government 
A longstanding justification for maintaining military installations worldwide for the United States is that a military presence abroad by the U.S. promotes and strengthens democracy.

Statements by others 
According to Hermann and Kegley, military interventions have boosted democracy in other nations.
The majority of academics, however, concur with professor of international politics Abraham Lowenthal that American efforts to spread democracy have been "negligible, often counterproductive, and only occasionally positive"

JoAnn Chirico believes that the U.S. military presence and installations are often considered responsible for suppressing democracy in countries such as Cameroon, Chad, Ethiopia, Jordan, Kuwait, Niger, Oman, Qatar and Saudi Arabia, and the United Arab Emirates.

According to Los Angeles Times, American authorities also believe that assisting authoritarian regimes or what they refer to as "friendly governments" benefits the United States and other nations. 
In her essay, Dictatorships and Double Standards, Kirkpatrick argues that although the United States should encourage democracy, it should be understood that premature reforms may cause a backlash that could give the Communists an opportunity to take over. For this reason, she considered it legitimate to support non-communist dictatorships, adding that a successful and sustainable democratic process is likely to be a long-term process in many cases in the Third World. The essence of the so-called Kirkpatrick Doctrine is the use of selective methods to advance democracy in order to contain the wave of communism.

Current deployments 
The following regional tables provide detail of where personnel from five branches of the US military are currently deployed. These numbers do not include any military or civilian contractors, dependents or the United States Space Force. Additionally, countries in which US military are engaged in active combat operations are not included. The numbers are based on the most recent United States Department of Defense statistics as of September 30, 2022.

Americas

East Asia, Southeast Asia, and Pacific Ocean

Europe

West Asia, Central Asia, South Asia, Africa, and Indian Ocean

Unspecified

See also 
List of United States overseas military bases
List of United States military bases
Marine Security Guard
Military Assistance Advisory Group
Military Assistance Command, Vietnam
United States Taiwan Defense Command
Status of forces agreement
United States foreign aid

References

Further reading 

United States military presence in other countries